Spyridon Valettas (1779 - 11 June 1843) was a Greek scholar, a member of the Filiki Eteria and for a short time the first minister of education and ecclesiastics affairs in the short-lived government of Alexandros Mavrokordatos in 1841.

Biography
He was born in Chora in Ios island and came from a noble family. He was trained initially in Ios and later in Patmos, Sifnos and Constantinople. From 1818 he served in Bucharest as the secretary of the ruler Alexandros Soutsos. He translated many works, some by using a pseudonym. In 1818 he was also introduced to the Filiki Eteria. In 1821 he moved to Transylvania, where he stayed until 1827. From 1827 until 1829 he stayed in Rijeka. In October 1829 he left for Greece, where he arrived in November. He went to Hydra at the assembly against Kapodistrias in August 1831 and in July 1832 he represented Ios to the Fifth National Assembly, as mentioned in the Greek Government Gazette. In 1833 he is in Athens. He translated many literary and political works. He took part in the Government of Mavrocordatos as Minister of Public Education and Ecclesiastics affairs from 24 June to 11 August 1841. He died on 11 June 1843, leaving his fortune to public educational institutions.

Sources

References

1779 births
1843 deaths
Greek politicians
Greek revolutionaries
Members of the Filiki Eteria
People from Ios